Transmembrane emp24 domain-containing protein 5 is a protein that in humans is encoded by the TMED5 gene.

Gene

General properties 
TMED5 (transmembrane emp24 domain-containing protein 5) is also known as p28, p24g2, and CGI-100. The human gene spans 30,775 base pairs over 4 exons and 3 introns for transcript variant 1, 5 exons and 4 introns for transcript variant 2, and it is located on the minus strand of chromosome 1, at 1p22.1.

Expression 
TMED5 has ubiquitous expression with transcripts detected in 246 tissues. Androgen deprivation led to lower expression in mice splenocytes compared to the control. Human dendritic cells infected with Chlamydia pneumoniae showed an absence of TMED5 expression compared to uninfected dendritic cells which had moderate expression.

mRNA transcript 
TMED5 has two coding transcript variants and one non-coding transcript variant produced by alternative splicing. Isoform 1 has 4 exons and encodes a protein 229 amino acids. Isoform 2 has 5 exons and encodes a protein with a shorter C-terminus 193 amino acids due to an additional exon causing a frameshift.

Protein

General properties 
TMED5 contains a signal peptide. After cleavage of the signal peptide, TMED5 isoform 1 is composed of 202 amino acids and has a molecular weight of ~23 kDa. The mature form of isoform 2 is composed of 166 amino acids and has a molecular weight of ~19 kDa. Both isoforms have an isolectric point of approximately 4.6.

Composition 
Compared to the reference set of human proteins, TMED5 has fewer alanine and proline residues but more aspartic acid and phenylalanine residues. TMED5 isoform 1 has one hydrophobic segment that corresponds with its transmembrane region.

Domains and motifs 

TMED5 isoform 1 is a single-pass transmembrane protein and is composed of a lumenal domain, one transmembrane (helical) domain, and a cytoplasmic domain. 

TMED5 is part of the emp24/gp25L/p24 family/GOLD family protein.

TMED5 contains a di-lysine motif and predicted NLS in its cytoplasmic tail.

Structure 
The structure of TMED5 isoform 1 consists of beta strands making up the lumenal region, disparate coil-coiled regions, alpha helices making up the transmembrane domain, and alpha helices making up some of the cytoplasmic domain.

Post-translational modifications 
TMED5 has two predicted phosphorylation sites in the cytosolic region, Ser227 and Thr229.

Localization 
TMED5's predicted location is in the plasma membrane, with an extracellular N-terminus and intracellular C-terminus. TMED5's localization is predicted to be cytoplasmic, but has been found in some tissues to be located in the nucleus.

Interacting proteins 
The following table provides a list of proteins most likely to interact with TMED5. Not shown in the table are Wnt family proteins which are known to interact with the p24 protein family.

Function and clinical significance  
TMED5 is a part of the p24 protein family whose general functions are protein trafficking for the secretory pathway. TMED5 is thought to be necessary in the formation of the Golgi into a ribbon.

Glycosylphosphatidylinositol-anchored proteins (GPI-AP) depend on p24 cargo receptors for transport from the ER to the Golgi. Knockdown of p24γ2 (a mouse ortholog of TMED5) in mice resulted in impaired transport of GPI-AP. The study concluded that the α-helical region of p24γ2 binds GPI which is necessary to incorporate it into COPII transport vesicles.

TMED5 is reported to be necessary for the secretion of Wnt ligands. TMED5 has been found to interact with WNT7B, activating the canonical WNT-CTNNB1/β-catenin signaling pathway. This pathway is linked to numerous cancers because upregulation of the Wnt/β-catenin signaling pathway leads to cytosolic accumulation of β-catenin, promoting cellular proliferation.

Research has identified bladder cancer to have a common chromosomal amplification at 1p21-22 and showed significant upregulation of TMED5.

Evolution

Homology

Paralogs 
TMED5 paralogs include TMED1, TMED2, TMED3, TMED4, TMED6, TMED7, TMED8, TMED9, and TMED10. All paralogs share the conserved transmembrane domain and contain the characteristic GOLD domain as included in the emp24/gp25L/p24 family/GOLD family proteins.

Orthologs 
TMED5 is found to be conserved in vertebrates, invertebrates, plants and fungi, and there are 243 known organisms that have orthologs with the gene. The following table provides a sample of the ortholog space of TMED5.

References 

Proteins